Italy competed at the 2001 World Championships in Athletics in Edmonton, Canada from 3 to 12 August 2001.

Medalists

Finalists
The team ranked 12th (with 9 finalists) in the IAAF placing table. Rank obtained by assigning eight points in the first place and so on to the eight finalists.

Results
Italy participated with 38 athletes by winning four medals.

Men (22)

Women (16)

References

External links
 The “Azzurri” at the World Championships (from 1983 to 2015)

Nations at the 2001 World Championships in Athletics
World Championships in Athletics
Italy at the World Championships in Athletics